Miguel Palanca Fernández (born 18 December 1987) is a Spanish footballer. Mainly a right winger, he can also operate as a forward.

Club career
Born in Tarragona, Catalonia, Palanca was a product of RCD Espanyol's youth academy, playing once for the first team in 2006–07 then spending the following season solely with the reserves. His La Liga debut arrived on 29 April 2007, as he came on as a substitute for Albert Riera during the second half of a 3–1 away loss against Sevilla FC.

Subsequently, Palanca was sold to Real Madrid. On 13 December 2008 he made his debut for the main squad, replacing Wesley Sneijder in the first half of a 2–0 away defeat to FC Barcelona. Again from the bench, he helped his team beat Valencia CF one week later at the Santiago Bernabéu Stadium (1–0).

Palanca was loaned to CD Castellón of the Segunda División for 2009–10. The following campaign, after the club's relegation, he signed a two-year contract with another side in that league, Elche CF, with Real Madrid having an option to re-buy on any given period during that timeframe.

On 27 January 2015, after one and a half seasons with CD Numancia also in the second tier, Palanca signed with Australian club Adelaide United FC. He was released at the end of the season, after his contract was not renewed.

On 8 July 2015, Palanca signed a one-year deal with Gimnàstic de Tarragona, recently returned to the second tier. He scored his first goals for his hometown team on 9 September in a 2–2 home draw with neighbours Girona FC in the second round of the Copa del Rey, also converting the decisive attempt in the subsequent penalty shootout.

Palanca moved abroad again on 20 July 2016, agreeing to a two-year contract with Poland's Korona Kielce. Coming from the bench, he netted his first goal on 6 August in a 4–1 home Ekstraklasa win over Lech Poznań.

On 14 August 2018, Palanca joined Indian Super League club FC Goa. The following 31 January, he returned to Gimnàstic on a short-term deal.

Personal life
Palanca's father, Santiago, played as a striker for Gimnàstic, scoring a record 48 goals at their Nou Estadi.

Club statistics

References

External links

1987 births
Living people
Sportspeople from Tarragona
Spanish footballers
Footballers from Catalonia
Association football wingers
Association football forwards
La Liga players
Segunda División players
Segunda División B players
Tercera División players
RCD Espanyol B footballers
RCD Espanyol footballers
Real Madrid Castilla footballers
Real Madrid CF players
CD Castellón footballers
Elche CF players
CD Numancia players
Gimnàstic de Tarragona footballers
FC Andorra players
Real Avilés CF footballers
A-League Men players
Adelaide United FC players
Ekstraklasa players
Korona Kielce players
Cypriot First Division players
Anorthosis Famagusta F.C. players
Indian Super League players
FC Goa players
Spanish expatriate footballers
Expatriate soccer players in Australia
Expatriate footballers in Poland
Expatriate footballers in Cyprus
Expatriate footballers in India
Expatriate footballers in Andorra
Spanish expatriate sportspeople in Australia
Spanish expatriate sportspeople in Poland
Spanish expatriate sportspeople in Cyprus
Spanish expatriate sportspeople in India
Spanish expatriate sportspeople in Andorra